Las Pirañas aman en Cuaresma (English: The Piranhas love in Lent) is a 1969 Mexican drama film.

Synopsis  
After the death of her husband who is devoured by sharks, Eulalia (Isela Vega) along with her daughter Mirta (Ofelia Medina), as two fisherwomen, are rejected by the people in their village, whom she calls "piranhas". A local painter decides to approach them with the purpose of seducing them.

Cast 
 Isela Vega
 Ofelia Medina
 Julio Alemán
 Gonzalo Vega
 Macaria

External links 
 

1969 films
Mexican drama films
1960s Spanish-language films
1969 drama films
Films directed by Francisco del Villar
1960s Mexican films